Yang Jingzhu (born 19 January 1976) is a Chinese former professional tennis player.

In 1999 he made his only ATP Tour main draw appearance, partnering Li Si in doubles at the Shanghai Open. He and Si were beaten in the first round by the world's top ranked doubles pair, Mahesh Bhupathi and Leander Paes.

Yang featured in five Davis Cup ties for China and also represented his country in multi-sport events. He was a men's doubles bronze medalist at the 2001 Universiade in Beijing and also competed at the 2002 Asian Games in Busan.

References

External links
 
 
 

1976 births
Living people
Chinese male tennis players
Medalists at the 2001 Summer Universiade
Universiade medalists in tennis
Universiade bronze medalists for China
Tennis players at the 2002 Asian Games
Asian Games competitors for China
21st-century Chinese people